Daniel Mark Clark  (born 16 September 1988) is a retired British professional basketball player who was a member of the Great Britain national team. He is a former Great Britain senior team captain, and finished his international career as all-time leader in men’s appearances (119), points (1,100), rebounds (555), blocked shots, field goals made, 2-point field goals made and 3-point field goals made.

Early life
Clark is from a well-known British basketball family, his father Mark coached the GB national women’s team from 2006–09 and his mother played for the national team. His sister Ella Clark is also an international basketball player. Clark decided to reject the chance to play college basketball in the United States and instead opted to accept an invitation to play at the academy of Spanish ACB club, CB Estudiantes. Before this, he attended Chingford Foundation School.

Professional career
Coming through the Spanish club's junior ranks, Clark made his full debut in the ACB in December 2006 before spending loan spells in the Spanish second division with the Estudiantes farm team CB Breogan in the 2007–08 and 2008–09 seasons. Since the start of the 2009–10 Clark established himself into the regular rotation for CB Estudiantes and then into the starting five.

On 20 October 2016 Clark signed with Macedonian club MZT Skopje Aerodrom. On 1 March 2017, he left MZT. On 9 March 2017, he signed with UCAM Murcia for the rest of the 2016–17 ACB season.

On 28 August 2017 Clark signed with San Sebastián Gipuzkoa for the 2017–18 ACB season.

On 5 December 2019 he signed a 2-month contract with MoraBanc Andorra of the Liga ACB.

On January 16, 2021, he has signed with Real Betis of the Liga ACB. before finishing his career with a season at Manchester Giants.

International career
Clark represented England and Great Britain at junior and under-20 levels, He earned his first cap for the Great Britain Men's National Team in the summer of 2009 and was part of the team that competed at the 2009 Eurobasket in Poland.
Clark also represented Team GB at the 2012 Summer Olympics in London. Following the close of his career at EuroBasket 2022, he had accumulated 119 GB appearances, then a record for the men's team.

References

External links

Profile at acb.com
Profile at fiba.com

1988 births
Living people
ABA League players
Baloncesto Fuenlabrada players
Basket Zaragoza players
Basketball players at the 2012 Summer Olympics
Basketball players from Greater London
People from Greenwich
BC Andorra players
Expatriate basketball people in Andorra
British expatriate basketball people
CB Breogán players
CB Estudiantes players
CB Murcia players
English expatriate sportspeople in Spain
English men's basketball players
British expatriate basketball people in Spain
Gipuzkoa Basket players
KK MZT Skopje players
Liga ACB players
Olympic basketball players of Great Britain
Power forwards (basketball)
Saski Baskonia players